Joel Hirschhorn (December 18, 1937 – September 17, 2005) was an American songwriter. He won the Academy Award for Best Original Song on two occasions. He also wrote songs for a number of musicians, including Elvis Presley and Roy Orbison. Hirschhorn was born in the Bronx and attended the High School of Performing Arts in Manhattan. After graduating, Hirschhorn became a regular performer on New York's nightclub circuit, both as a solo singer and as a member of the rock & roll band, The Highlighters.

During the mid-1960s, Hirschhorn branched out into writing film soundtracks. The first score he wrote was for Who Killed Teddy Bear? (1965), which was directed by his friend Joseph Cates. He worked with Cates again the following year in The Fat Spy. However, the film was received so badly that Hirschhorn struggled to find work in Hollywood for years afterwards.

Hirschhorn, along with songwriting partner Al Kasha, did not work on another film until 1970's The Cheyenne Social Club, which was directed by Gene Kelly. It was the pair's next effort, for The Poseidon Adventure (1972), that really made their name. "The Morning After", a song they wrote in a single evening, won them their first Oscar and also topped the Billboard chart.

The Towering Inferno (1974) provided Hirschhorn and Kasha with their second Oscars, this time for the "We May Never Love Like This Again". Following this success, the pair received two further Oscar nominations, both for their work on Pete's Dragon (1977).

Hirschhorn and Kasha continued to work together until the late 1990s, their final collaboration being Rescue Me (1992). The pair also worked together on Broadway musicals, receiving Tony Award for Best Original Score nominations for both Copperfield and Seven Brides for Seven Brothers. Late in his career, Hirschhorn wrote The Complete Idiot's Guide to Songwriting, which was first published in 2001.

External links

 

1938 births
2005 deaths
Best Original Song Academy Award-winning songwriters
Jewish American songwriters
Songwriters from New York (state)
American film score composers
American musical theatre composers
American musical theatre lyricists
American lyricists
Broadway composers and lyricists
Fiorello H. LaGuardia High School alumni
People from the Bronx
Jewish American musicians
Jewish rock musicians
Nightclub performers
Burials at Valley Oaks Memorial Park
20th-century American composers
20th-century American Jews
21st-century American Jews